International School in Bremen (ISB) is a private, co-educational, English-speaking school that was established in 1998 in Bremen - Horn-Lehe,, Badgasteiner Straße 11/Hochschulring, Germany. Jamie Perfect became Director of the school in 2018, following Malcom Davis.

External links 
 Official ISB Website
 MINT EC ISB Microsite

International schools in Bremen (state)
Buildings and structures in Bremen (city)
Education in Bremen